Benjamin Oliver Coad (born 10 January 1994) is an English cricketer, contracted to play for Yorkshire County Cricket Club.

Early life and education
Coad was born on 10 January 1994 in Harrogate, North Yorkshire, England. He was educated at Thirsk School and Sixth Form College, a state secondary school in Sowerby, Thirsk, North Yorkshire.

Cricket career
Coad made his county debut on 2 June 2013 in the 2013 Yorkshire Bank 40 fixture against Gloucestershire. His maiden first-class match was for Yorkshire against Durham at the Riverside Ground in Chester-le-Street, which started on 20 June 2016. He had figures of 0-38, and 1-70 when bowling, and scored 17 not out in his only innings.

References

External links
 

1994 births
Living people
Yorkshire cricketers
English cricketers
Cricketers from Harrogate
English cricketers of the 21st century